An election to Clare County Council took place on 20 June 1985 as part of that year's Irish local elections. 32 councillors were elected from six electoral divisions by PR-STV voting for a six-year term of office.

Results by party

Results by Electoral Area

Ennis

Ennistymon

Killaloe

Kilrush

Miltown-Malbay

Shannon

External links
 Official website
 irishelectionliterature

1985 Irish local elections
1985